Shalah Kosh (also Romanized as Sholeh Kosh) is a village in Ghaleh Rural District, in the Zagros District of Chardavol County, Ilam Province, Iran. At the 2006 census, its population was 965, in 172 families.  The village is the capital of Ghaleh Rural District, established on June 30, 2013. The village is populated by Kurds.

References 

Populated places in Chardavol County
Kurdish settlements in Ilam Province